Queen Mary's College may refer to:
Queen Mary's College, Basingstoke, a sixth-form college in Basingstoke, Hampshire, England
Queen Mary's College, Chennai, a tertiary college for women in Chennai, India
Queen Mary College, Lahore, a girls' school in Lahore, Pakistan
Queen Mary University of London, a university in London, England, formerly known as Queen Mary College